Property Wars is an American reality television series that airs on the Discovery Channel and premiered on July 12, 2012. The second season was announced on December 18, 2012, with the season debut on January 10, 2013. Property Wars follows a group of men, located in Phoenix, Arizona, who bid to purchase foreclosed homes, without being able to look inside. In each episode, the main cast members stand in front of the home to see what condition it is in while their bidder is on location at the auction for the home.

Cast

Doug Hopkins
Scott Menaged
Lou Amoroso
John Ray
Ed Rosenberg
Steve Simons

Legal Problems
Both during and after the show wrapped filming some of the buyers found themselves in legal issues.
John Ray – Told by Arizona regulators to shut down his business in 2014 due to having his real estate sales license terminated in July 2011. Ray had also filed for Chapter 13 Bankruptcy in 2013.
Scott Menaged – In May 2017, it was revealed that federal investigators say Menaged and three others (Veronica Castro, Alberto Pena and Troy Flippo) worked together to commit bank fraud. Menaged's furniture stores were raided by federal agents. He was indicted on 24 charges and sentenced to 17 years in prison. Menaged's case was featured on American Greed in 2019.

Episodes

Season 1 (2012)

Season 2 (2013)

References

External links
 

2010s American reality television series
2012 American television series debuts
2013 American television series endings
Discovery Channel original programming
Television shows filmed in Arizona
Foreclosure